Chaney Leonard White (April 15, 1894 – February 23, 1967), nicknamed "Reindeer", was an outfielder in Negro league baseball between 1920 and 1936.

References

External links
 and Baseball-Reference Black Baseball stats and Seamheads
Negro League Baseball Museum

1894 births
1967 deaths
Bacharach Giants players
Baltimore Black Sox players
Hilldale Club players
Homestead Grays players
New York Cubans players
Philadelphia Stars players
Washington Potomacs players
Wilmington Potomacs players
20th-century African-American sportspeople
Baseball outfielders